Mohammad Abdullah is a Bangladesh Awami League politician and the former Member of Parliament from Laxmipur-4.

Career
Abdullah was elected to Parliament from Laxmipur-4 on 5 January 2014 as a Bangladesh Awami League candidate.

References

Awami League politicians
Living people
10th Jatiya Sangsad members
Year of birth missing (living people)